Ed Kahovec is an American college baseball coach and former shortstop, who is currently the head baseball coach of the Holy Cross Crusaders. Kahovec played college baseball at the University of Rochester from 2005 to 2008. He served as the head coach at Bard College (2013–2016).

Playing career

Kahovec attended Victor Senior High School in Victor, New York. Kahovec then attended University of Rochester where he would continue his baseball career. After playing as a backup as a freshman, Kahovec took over the starting shortstop role as a sophomore. He made the All-University Athletic Association First Team twice, and the All-Liberty League First Team once. He batted .372 in his senior year, leading the Yellowjackets to the regular season Liberty League title.

On May 20, 2008, Kahovec signed with the Erbach Grasshoppers of the German Baseball League.

Coaching career
Kahovec returned to Rochester in 2009 as an assistant for the Yellowjackets. On August 2, 2012, Kahovec was named the head baseball coach at Bard College.

In January, 2020, Kahovec was named the interim head baseball coach at Holy Cross. At the conclusion of the 2020 season, he was announced as the head coach for the Crusaders baseball program.

Head coaching record

References

External links
 Bard Raptors bio
 Holy Cross Crusaders bio

Living people
Rochester Yellowjackets baseball players
Rochester Yellowjackets baseball coaches
Bard Raptors baseball coaches
Holy Cross Crusaders baseball coaches
Year of birth missing (living people)
American expatriate baseball players in Germany
University of Missouri alumni
People from Victor, New York
Baseball coaches from New York (state)